The name Naomi has been used for three tropical cyclones in the Eastern Pacific Ocean.

 Tropical Storm Naomi (1961)
 Hurricane Naomi (1968)
 Tropical Storm Naomi (1976)

The name Naomi has been used twice in the Australian region.
 Cyclone Naomi (1983) – remained out at sea.
 Cyclone Naomi (1993)

Pacific hurricane set index articles
Australian region cyclone set index articles